The following graph is a timeline of spacecraft in orbit for the International Space Station. Long blue bars represent the modules and major components of the ISS. Green bars indicate a crewed Soyuz Spacecraft. The yellow bars indicate other crafts that docked at the International Space Station, including the Russian Proton Launcher, the Russian modified Soyuz Launcher, the European ATV and Japanese Kounotori robot spacecraft (HTV), the American Space Shuttle, the Russian Progress cargo spaceships, and the American Dragon spacecraft and Cygnus spacecraft.

ISS flight types
 R means flight financed by Russia, delivering Russian spacecraft (ISS module, Progress or Soyuz) and executed with Russian rocket (Soyuz or Proton).
 A means flight financed by the United States, primary focus on assembly, executed with the Space Shuttle.
 P means cargo re-supply and/or orbit-boost flight executed with the Progress spacecraft.
 S means human spaceflight with temporary visitors or delivering ISS Expedition crews, executed with Soyuz spacecraft
 E means flight financed by ESA, delivering modules owned by ESA, executed with the Space Shuttle.
 J means flight financed by JAXA, delivering modules owned by JAXA, executed with the Space Shuttle.
 ATV means cargo re-supply and/or orbit-boost flight executed with the Automated Transfer Vehicle spacecraft.
 HTV means cargo re-supply and/or orbit-boost flight executed with the H-II Transfer Vehicle spacecraft.
 A/R means flight financed by the United States, delivering modules owned by USA and manufactured by Russia, executed with Russian rocket.
 J/A means jointly financed JAXA/NASA flight, delivering equipment for both, executed with the Space Shuttle.
 UF means Utilization Flight, secondary assembly objectives/deliveries possible
 LF means Logistics Flight, secondary assembly objectives/deliveries possible
 ULF means Utilization and Logistics Flight, secondary assembly objectives/deliveries possible
 SpX means cargo re-supply flight executed with the SpaceX Dragon spacecraft.
 Orb means cargo re-supply flight executed with the Orbital Sciences Cygnus spacecraft.

See also
 International Space Station
 List of International Space Station visitors
 List of International Space Station spacewalks
 List of International Space Station assembly flights
 List of commanders of the ISS
 List of human spaceflights to the International Space Station
 Uncrewed spaceflights to the International Space Station
 List of Progress flights
 Mir
 List of human spaceflights to Mir
 List of uncrewed spaceflights to Mir

International Space Station